Wheeler is a ghost town in Wheeler County, Nebraska, United States.

History
Wheeler was originally called Baird, but when it was discovered that another place called Baird already existed, the town was renamed to avoid repetition.

A post office was established at Wheeler in 1881, and remained in operation until it was discontinued in 1934.

References

Geography of Wheeler County, Nebraska